Lionel Guyon is a French equestrian. At the 2012 Summer Olympics he competed in the Individual eventing.

References

French male equestrians

Living people
Olympic equestrians of France
Equestrians at the 2012 Summer Olympics
Year of birth missing (living people)